Tetrapleura is a genus of flowering plants in the mimosoid clade of the family Fabaceae.

Species in this genus include:
Tetrapleura chevalieri (Harms) Baker f.
Tetrapleura tetraptera (Schumach. & Thonn.) Taub. – Prekese tree

References

Mimosoids
Fabaceae genera